globalHell was a group of hackers, composed of about 60 individuals. The group disbanded in 1999, when 12 members were prosecuted for computer intrusion and 30 for lesser offences.

The members of the group were responsible for over a hundred website defacements, trafficking stolen personal and financial information and illegally accessing numerous teleconferences over which they co-ordinated their efforts. A few of the systems they broke into include those of United States Army, the White House, United States Cellular, Ameritech and the US Postal Service.

Members 
MostHateD – sentenced to 26 months' imprisonment and three years' supervised release.
Mindphasr – ordered to pay restitution to the U.S. Army and serve six months in prison, followed by three years of supervised release and to gain approval from future employers to use the Internet.
ne0h – ne0h is a Canadian hacker, featured in Kevin Mitnick's book, "The Art of Intrusion", but ne0h's real identity is unknown.

References

External links
Wired.com news article on globalHell.
ZDNet news article related to the disbandment of gH.

Hacker groups